The 1992–93 season was the 83rd year of football played by Dundee United, and covers the period from 1 July 1992 to 30 June 1993. United finished in fourth place in what was Jim McLean's final season as manager.

Season review
In February, Jim McLean announced he would resign as manager at the end of the season, ending 22 years in the post.

Match results
Dundee United played a total of 49 competitive matches during the 1992–93 season. The team finished fourth in the Scottish Premier Division.

In the cup competitions, United lost in the fourth round of the Tennent's Scottish Cup to Aberdeen and lost narrowly in the Skol Cup quarter-finals to Rangers.

Legend

All results are written with Dundee United's score first.

Premier Division

Tennent's Scottish Cup

Skol Cup

Player details
During the 1992–93 season, United used 25 different players comprising five nationalities. The table below shows the number of appearances and goals scored by each player.

|}

Goalscorers
United had 14 players score with the team scoring 70 goals in total. The top goalscorer was Paddy Connolly, who finished the season with 19 goals.

Discipline
During the 1992–93 season, three United players were sent off. Statistics for cautions are unavailable.

Team statistics

League table

Transfers

In
The club signed only one player – Scott Crabbe – during the season, as part of a swap deal. No money was spent on transfer fees.

Out
Five players were sold by the club during the season with one as part of a swap deal. The club raised over £1.25m in transfer sales.

Playing kit

The jerseys were sponsored by Belhaven for the final time, ending six years of association with the brewers.

Trivia
In the 4–0 victory at Partick Thistle on 13 February, referee Les Mottram ruled Paddy Connolly's goal – where the ball rebounded back from the inside stanchion – hadn't crossed the line. To make matters worse for United, a Partick defender picked the ball up with his hands, only for the referee to rule play on. The decision denied Connolly his first senior hat-trick.

See also
1992–93 in Scottish football

References

External links
Glenrothes Arabs 1992–93 season review

1992-93
Scottish football clubs 1992–93 season